Moyra Donaldson (born 1956) is a poet and short story writer from Northern Ireland.

Early life and education

Moyra Donaldson was born  in 1956 in, Newtownards, County Down. She attended Queen's University Belfast and the University of Ulster. Donaldson works in social work. She had her first collection published in 1998 to critical acclaim. Donaldson has won a number of awards including the Allingham Award, the National Women's Poetry Competition and the Cuirt New Writing Award as well as four awards from the Arts Council of Northern Ireland. She has had work short listed for the Hennessy New Irish Writing Awards. Donaldson has had her work featured on BBC Radio and television and on the Channel 4 production, Poems to Fall in Love With.

Donaldson is a creative writing tutor and has edited a number of anthologies. She was literary editor for Fortnight magazine. Donaldson is married and they have two daughters.

Bibliography

 Kissing Ghosts (1996)
 Snakeskin Stilettos (1998)
 Beneath The Ice (2001)
 Visions and Priorities (2001)
 The Horse's Nest (2006)
 Miracle Fruit (2010)
 Selected Poems (2012)
 The Goose Tree (2014)
 Blood Horses (2018)
 Carnivorous (2019)

References and sources

1956 births
Alumni of Ulster University
Alumni of Queen's University Belfast
People from Newtownards
Women writers from Northern Ireland
Living people